Facets is the debut studio album by American singer-songwriter Jim Croce, released and self-published in 1966. Croce had five hundred copies of the album pressed, financed with a $500 cash wedding gift that he and his wife to be, Ingrid Croce, received from his parents. Croce's parents were certain that Jim would fail completely at selling the record, and realizing that he couldn't support his family as a singer, would abandon music and finish his college education. The album was recorded in a three-hour session at a Delaware studio. Unexpectedly, it proved to be a success. Croce sold every record, even turning a profit of $2500. The majority of those records were sold to fans who attended Croce's shows at local bars. Original vinyl copies of Facets are extremely rare today. Shout! Factory released an expanded two-disc version in 2004.

Track listing

Personnel
Jim Croce – guitar, vocals
Richard Croce – percussion
Mike DiBenedetto – keyboards
Karl Fehrenbach – guitar, banjo
Ken Cavender – bass

Production
Producer: Joe Salviuolo
Arrangements: Jim Croce, Eric Von Schmidt

References

Jim Croce albums
1966 debut albums
Self-released albums
Shout! Factory albums